Local elections were held in Khyber Pakhtunkhwa, Pakistan on 30 May 2015. A total of 84,420 candidates contested 41,762 seats on district, town, neighbourhood and village councils. They were the first local elections in the province for ten years.

Background
The last local elections in the province took place in February 2005. The local councils that were then elected were dissolved on 20 February 2010 after their term of office ended and they were replaced by administrators until the 2015 elections.

The local elections in Khyber Pakhtunkhwa were to elect members of district councils, tehsil councils and village councils. To elect the 41,762 councillors, 11,261 polling stations were set up for the 13.1 million people who were eligible to vote. Each voter could cast seven votes, which meant 72.2 million ballot papers were printed. However, there were no elections in Kohistan after its division into two districts was challenged at Peshawar High Court.

Seats distribution 

Expected district council seats versus actual results

Based on actual votes cast at the 2013 general election

Election incidents
Women were prevented from voting in Shangla District after a local Jirga ruling, as well as in Lower Dir District, Buner District and parts of Swabi District. A number of people were injured during voting, while in Kohat a presiding officer at a polling station was suspended after allowing people to cast multiple votes.

Violent incidents after the election resulted in the deaths of at least 24 people. In one incident in Tank District ten people were killed and 10 wounded after supporters of a losing candidate threw hand grenades at the celebrating supporters of the winner.

See also
2021 Khyber Pakhtunkhwa local elections

References

2015 elections in Pakistan
Local elections
Local elections in Pakistan
May 2015 events in Pakistan
2015 local elections